The Williams FW20 was the car with which the Williams Formula One team competed in the 1998 Formula One World Championship. It was driven by Jacques Villeneuve, the reigning champion, and Heinz-Harald Frentzen, who was in his second year with the team.

Design 

The team was adversely affected by the departure of Chief Designer Adrian Newey to McLaren,  and Renault's withdrawal from F1 as an engine supplier. Newey and Renault had made Williams the dominant team of the early and mid-1990s. Newey had departed at the end of 1996, but his input had gone into the FW19 for 1997, so the FW20 was the first Williams car since 1990 that did not directly bear his design, although it cosmetically resembled the FW19. The car was equipped with a Mecachrome-badged version of what was essentially the previous year's engine. Also gone was the highly distinctive blue and white Rothmans livery, as the company had decided to promote its Winfield brand.

At the car's launch, Patrick Head and Geoff Willis admitted that the FW20 was a fairly conservative design but stressed that they were still hopeful of being competitive.

Season summary 
1998 was very disappointing compared to the previous championship-winning campaign. The team finished a distant third in the Constructors' Championship, with three podiums and no wins, a long way behind McLaren and Ferrari.

Villeneuve was unhappy with the season and had no chance to defend his title.  He signed with the new British American Racing team for 1999, and Frentzen departed to Jordan after two seasons spent largely in the shadow of his teammate.

Williams used 'Winfield' logos, except at the French, British and German Grands Prix.

Complete Formula One results
(key) (results in bold indicate pole position)

References
AUTOCOURSE 1998-99, Henry, Alan (ed.), Hazleton Publishing Ltd. (1998)

External links

Williams Formula One cars
1998 Formula One season cars